The 2020–21 UC Irvine Anteaters men's basketball team represented the University of California, Irvine in the 2020–21 NCAA Division I men's basketball season. They played their home games at the Bren Events Center in Irvine, California as a member of the Big West Conference. The Anteaters were led by 11th-year head coach Russell Turner. The team finished the season with an 18–9 (10–4) record finishing 2nd place in the standings and advanced to the 2021 Big West Conference men's basketball tournament where they were defeated by UC Santa Barbara 63–79. The Anteaters continued their success finishing 1st or 2nd for 7 straight seasons in the Big West Conference and 4 straight Big West tournament Championship games (the 2020 Big West Conference men's basketball tournament was canceled due to the COVID-19 pandemic). The school set a new scoring record and the largest margin of victory (80) on November 28, 2020 over NAIA opponent Bethesda University by the score of 135–55. Also new school records broken in that game were assists (31) and FGs made (56). New Bren Events Center records broken were the most points scored in a first half (70) and game FG % (0.691).

Previous season

The Anteaters finished the 2019–20 season 21–11, 13–3 in Big West play to win their second straight regular season title. However, the Big West tournament and all other postseason tournaments were canceled as a result of the ongoing COVID-19 pandemic, effectively ending their season.

The program has won at least 20 games in seven of the last eight seasons. Russell Turner became the winningest coach in program history on January 15 surpassing Pat Douglass's total of 197 wins and won his fourth Big West Coach of the Year Award. Evan Leonard, Eyassu Worku, and Tommy Rutherford all recorded their 1000th point during the season, the first time the program has had three players score 1,000 career points in the same season. The team was 12th in the nation in field goal percentage defense, holding opponents to (38.8%) shooting, 11th in total rebounds (1,269), and third in rebounding margin (+9.4). Brad Greene set a Bren Events Center record with 21 rebounds on January 11 vs Hawaii.

Roster
The Anteaters had the 2nd youngest team in the nation with 13 underclassmen, behind Navy which had 19.

Source

Schedule and results

|-
!colspan=12 style=| Regular season

|-
!colspan=12 style=| Big West tournament

|-

Source

References

UC Irvine Anteaters men's basketball seasons
UC Irvine
UC Irvine
UC Irvine